Pribil (fl. 1370s) was a Serbian župan (count) who built the Dobrun Monastery in Dobrun, Višegrad, as a family funeral church. He founded the church together with his sons, župan Petar and župan Stefan. There are frescoes of the family, and of a higher-ranked nobleman, protovestijar Stan, who was Pribil's father-in-law.
 
The founding date of the monastery is uncertain. Dates have been given as: reign of King Stefan Dušan (before 1343); 1360–70; and 1370s.

Family
With his wife Boleslava, he had two sons:
župan Petar ( 1383), took monastic vows as Jovan
župan Stefan

See also
Dobrun Monastery
Serbian nobility

References

14th-century Serbian nobility
People from Višegrad
People of the Kingdom of Serbia (medieval)
People of the Serbian Empire
Serbs of Bosnia and Herzegovina